An as-yet-unnamed Powelliphanta species is provisionally known as Powelliphanta "Anatoki Range".  It is one of the amber snails. It is an undescribed species of large, carnivorous land snail, a terrestrial pulmonate gastropod mollusc in the family Rhytididae.

Conservation status
Powelliphanta "Anatoki Range" is classified as Nationally Critical by the New Zealand Threat Classification System.

References

 New Zealand Department of Conservation Threatened Species Classification
 Department of Conservation Recovery Plans

Gastropods of New Zealand
Powelliphanta
Undescribed gastropod species
Endemic fauna of New Zealand
Endemic molluscs of New Zealand